The Ministry of Education, Science and Culture is an Icelandic cabinet-level ministry founded 16 December 1942. The ministry is divided into three departments and four offices. The current Minister of Education, Science and Culture is Lilja Dögg Alfreðsdóttir.

See also 

 Education and General Affairs Committee
Icelandic Centre for Research

External links 
  
  

1942 establishments in Iceland
Iceland
Education in Iceland
Educational organizations based in Iceland
Iceland
Education, Science and Culture
Icelandic culture
Iceland, Education, Science and Culture
Iceland
Science and technology in Iceland